Tajikistan harkens to the Samanid Empire (819–999). The Tajik people came under Russian rule in the 1860s. The Basmachi revolt broke out in the wake of the Russian Revolution of 1917 and was quelled in the early 1920s during the Russian Civil War. In 1924, Tajikistan became an Autonomous Soviet Socialist Republics of the Soviet Union, the Tajik ASSR, within Uzbekistan. In 1929, Tajikistan was made one of the component republics of the Soviet Union – Tajik Soviet Socialist Republic (Tajik SSR) – and it kept that status until gaining independence 1991 after the dissolution of the Soviet Union.

It has since experienced three changes in government and the Tajikistani Civil War. A peace agreement among rival factions was signed in 1997.

Antiquity (600 BC – 651 AD)

Tajikistan was part of Scythia in Classical Antiquity. Sogdiana, Bactria, Merv and Khorezm were the four principal divisions of Ancient Central Asia inhabited by the ancestors of the present-day Tajikistani Tajiks. Tajiks are now found only in historic Bactria and Sogdiana. Merv is inhabited by the Turkoman and Khorezm by Uzbeks and Kazakhs. Sogdiana was made up of the Zeravshan and Kashka-Darya river valleys. Currently, two of the surviving peoples of Sogdiana who speak a dialect of the Sogdian language are the Yaghnobis and Shugnanis.

Tajikistan was part of the Bactria-Margiana Archaeological Complex in the Bronze Age, candidate for Proto-Indo-Iranian or Proto-Iranian culture. Bactria was located in northern Afghanistan (present-day Afghan Turkestan) between the mountain range of the Hindu Kush and the Amu Darya (Oxus) River and some areas of current south Tajikistan. During different periods, Bactria was a center of various Kingdoms or Empires, and is probably where Zoroastrianism originated. The "Avesta"—the holy book of Zoroastrianism—was written in the old-Bactrian dialect; it is also thought that Zoroaster was most likely born in Bactria.

Some authors have also suggested that in the 7th and 6th century BCE parts of modern Tajikistan, including territories in the Zeravshan valley, formed part of Kambojas, which were referenced in the Mahabharata epic as the Parama Kamboja, before it became part of the Achaemenid Empire.Linguistic evidence, combined with ancient literary and inscriptional evidence suggest the Kambojas originally emigrated from Central Asia.

Achaemenid Period (550 BC – 329 BC)
During the Achaemenid period, Sogdiana and Bactria were part of the Achaemenid empire. Sogdians and Bactrians occupied important positions in the administration and military of the Achaemenid Empire

Hellenistic Period (329 BC – 90 BC)

After the Achaemenid Empire was defeated by Alexander the Great, Bactria, Sogdiana and Merv, being part of Persian Empire, had to defend themselves from new invaders. In fact, the Macedonians faced very stiff resistance under the leadership of Sogdian ruler Spitamenes. Alexander the Great managed to marry Roxana, the daughter of a local ruler, and inherited his land. Following Alexander's brief occupation, the Hellenistic successor states of the Seleucids and Greco-Bactrians controlled the area for another 200 years in what is known as the Greco-Bactrian Kingdom. During the time period from 90 BC to 30 BC, Yuezhi destroyed the last Hellenistic successor states and, together with the Tokhari, (to whom they were closely related) created a Kushan Empire around 30 AD.

Kushan Empire (30 BC – 410 AD)
For another 400 years, until 410 AD, the Kushan Empire was a major power in the region along with the Roman Empire, the Parthian Empire and Han China. Notable contact was made with local peoples when the envoys of the Han dynasty journeyed to this area in the 2nd century BC. At the end of the Kushan period, the Empire became much smaller and would have to defend itself from the powerful Sassanid Empire that replaced the Parthian Empire. The famous Kushan king Kanishka promoted Buddhism and during this time Buddhism was exported from Central Asia to China.

The Sassanids, Hephthalites, and Gokturks (224–710)

The Sassanids once controlled much of what is now Tajikistan, but lost the territory to the Hephthalites (possibly also of Iranian descent) during the time of Peroz I.

They created a powerful empire that succeeded in making Iran a tributary state around 483–485. Shah of Persia Peroz fought three wars with Hephthalites. During the first war he was captured by Hephthalite army and later was released after Byzantine emperor paid a ransom for him. During the second war Peroz was captured again and was released after paying a huge contribution to the Hephthalite king. During the third war Peroz was killed. The Hephthalites were subjugated in 565 by a combination of Sassanid and Kök-Turk forces. Subsequently, present Tajikistan was ruled by Göktürks and Sassanids, however when the Sassanid Empire fell the Turks kept control of Tajikistan but they later lost it to the Tang dynasty, however, they later managed to take control of Tajikistan once again, only to lose it to the Arabs in 710.

Medieval history (710–1506)

Arab Caliphate (710–867)

The Transoxiana principalities never formed a viable confederacy. Beginning in 651, the Arabs organized periodic marauding raids deep into the territory of Transoxania, but it was not until the appointment of Ibn Qutaiba as Governor of Khorasan in 705, during the reign of Walid I, that the Caliphate adopted the policy of annexing the lands beyond the Oxus. In 715, the task of annexation was accomplished. The entire region thus came under the control of the Caliph and of Islam, but the Arabs continued to rule through local Soghdian Kings and dihqans. The ascension of the Abbasids to rule the Caliphate (750 - 1258) opened a new era in the history of Central Asia. While their predecessors the Umayyads (661 - 750) were little more than leaders of a loose confederation of Arab tribes, the Abbasids set out to build a huge multi-ethnic centralized state that would emulate and perfect the Sassanian government machine. They gave the Near East and Transoxiana a unity, which they had been lacking since the time of Alexander the Great.

Samanid Empire (819–999)

The Samanid dynasty ruled (819–1005) in Khorasan (including Eastern Iran and Transoxiana) and was founded by Saman Khuda. The Samanids were one of the first purely indigenous dynasties to rule in Persia after the Muslim Arab conquest. During the reign (892–907) of Saman Khuda's great-grandson, Ismail I (known as Ismail Samani), Samanids expanded in Khorasan. In 900, Ismail defeated the Saffarids in Khorasan (area of current Northwest Afghanistan and northeastern Iran), while his brother was the governor of Transoxiana. Thus, Samanid rule was acclaimed over the combined regions. The cities of Bukhara (the Samanid capital) and Samarkand became centres of art, science, and literature; industries included pottery making and bronze casting. After 950, Samanid power weakened, but was briefly revitalized under Nuh II, who ruled from 976 to 997. However, with the oncoming encroachment of Muslim Turks, the Samanids lost their domains south of the Oxus river which were taken by Ghaznavids.  In 999, Bukhara was taken by the Qarakhanids.  The Samanid Isma'il Muntasir (died 1005) tried to restore the dynasty (1000–1005), until he was assassinated by an Arab bedouin chieftain.

The attack of the Qarakhanid Turks ended the Samanid dynasty in 999 and dominance in Transoxiana passed on to Turkic rulers.

Qarakhanids (999–1211) and Khwarezmshahs (1211–1218)
After the collapse of Samanid Dynasty, Central Asia became the battleground of many Asian invaders who came from the north-east.

Mongol rule (1218–1370)

The Mongol Empire swept through Central Asia, invaded Khwarezmian Empire and sacked the cities of Bukhara and Samarkand, looting and massacring people everywhere.

Timurid Empire (1370–1506)
Timur, founder of the Timurid Empire, was born on 8 April 1336 in Kesh near Samarkand. He was a member of the Turkicized Barlas tribe, a Mongol subgroup that had settled in Transoxiana after taking part in Genghis Khan's son Chagatai's campaigns in that region. Timur began his life as a bandit leader. During this period, he received an arrow-wound in the leg, as a result of which he was nicknamed Timur-e Lang (in Dari) or Timur the Lame. Although the last Timurid ruler of Herat, Badi az Zaman finally fell to the armies of the Uzbek Muhammad Shaibani Khan in 1506, the Timurid ruler of Ferghana, Zahir-ud-Din Babur, survived the collapse of the dynasty and re-established the Timurid dynasty in India in 1526 where they became known as the Mughals.

Early modern history (1506–1868)

Turkic rule (1506–1598)
The Shaybanid state was divided into appanages between all male members (sultans) of the dynasty, who would designate the supreme ruler (Khan), the oldest member of clan. The seat of Khan was first Samarkand, the capital of the Timurids, but some of the Khans preferred to remain in their former appanages. Thus, Bukhara became the seat of the khan for the first time under Ubaid Allah Khan (r. 1533–1539).

The period of political expansion and economical prosperity was short-lived. Soon after the death of Abd Allah Khan the Shaibanid dynasty died out and was replaced by the Janid or Astrakhanid (Ashtarkhanid) dynasty, another branch of the descendants of Jöchi, whose founder Jani Khan was related to Abd Allah Khan Through his marriage to Abdullah Khan's Sister. The Astrakhanids are also said to be connected to the Hashemites due to Imam Quli Khan's status as a Sayyid. Their descendants today live in India. In 1709, eastern part of Khanate of Bukhara seceded and formed Khanate of Kokand. Thus, the eastern part of present Tajikistan passed to the Khanate of Kokand, while the western one remained part of the Khanate of Bukhara.

Iranian and Bukharan rule (1740–1868)
In 1740, the Janid khanate was conquered by Nader Shah, the Afsharid ruler of Iran. The Janid khan Abu al Faiz retained his throne, becoming Nadir's vassal.

After the death of Nader Shah in 1747, the chief of the Manghit tribe, Muhammad Rahim Biy Azaliq, overcame his rivals from other tribes and consolidated his rule in the Khanate of Bukhara. His successor, however, ruled in the name of puppet khans of Janid origin. In 1785 Shah Murad formalized the family's dynastic rule (Manghit dynasty), and the khanate became the Emirate of Bukhara

Modern History (1868—1991)

Russian Vassalage (1868–1920)

Russian Imperialism led to the Russian Empire's conquest of Central Asia during the late 19th century's Imperial Era.  Between 1864 and 1885 Russia gradually took control of the entire territory of Russian Turkestan, the Tajikistan portion of which had been controlled by the Emirate of Bukhara and Khanate of Kokand ( from today's border with Kazakhstan in the north to the Caspian Sea in the west and the border with Afghanistan in the south). Tashkent was conquered in 1865 and in 1867 the Turkestan Governor-Generalship was created with Konstantin Petrovich Von Kaufman as the first Governor-General.

The expansion was motivated by Russia's economic interests and was connected with the American Civil War in the early 1860s, which severely interrupted the supply of cotton fiber to the Russian industry and forced Russia to turn to Central Asia as an alternative source of cotton supply as well as a market for Russian made goods. The Russian regime in the 1870s attempted to switch cultivation in the region from grain to cotton (a strategy later copied and expanded by the Soviets). By 1885 Tajikistan's territory was either ruled by the Russian Empire or its vassal state, the Emirate of Bukhara, nevertheless Tajiks felt little Russian influence.

Russian Empire, being a much bigger state with a huge population and having an advanced military, had little difficulty in conquering the regions inhabited by Tajiks, meeting fierce resistance only at Jizzakh, Ura-Tyube, and when their garrison in Samarkand was besieged in 1868 by forces from Shahr-e Sabz and the inhabitants of the city. The army of the Emirate of Bukhara was utterly defeated in three battles, and on 18 June 1868 Emir Mozaffar al-Din (r. 1860–1885) signed a peace treaty with the Governor-General of Russian Turkestan Von Kaufman. Samarkand and the Upper Zeravshan were annexed by Russia and the country was opened to Russian merchants. The emir retained his throne as a vassal of Russia and with Russian help he established control over Shahr-e Sabz, the mountainous regions in the upper Zeravshan Valley(1870) and the principalities of the western Pamir (1895).

During the late 19th century the Jadidists established themselves as an Islamic social movement throughout the region. Although the Jadidists were pro-modernization and not necessarily anti-Russian the Russians viewed the movement as a threat. Russian troops were required to restore order during uprisings against the Khanate of Kokand between 1910 and 1913. Further violence occurred in July 1916 when demonstrators attacked Russian soldiers in Khujand over the threat of forced conscription during World War I. Despite Russian troops quickly bringing Khujand back under control, clashes continued throughout the year in various locations in Tajikistan.

At the end of August 1920 the last emir, Sayyid Alim Khan, was overthrown by Soviet troops. On 6 October 1920 the emirate was abolished and the Bukharan People's Soviet Republic was proclaimed.

Basmachi movement (1916-1924)

The Basmachi movement or Basmachi Revolt was an uprising against Russian Imperial and Soviet rule that arose after the Russian Revolution of 1917 guerrillas throughout Central Asia.

The movement's roots lay in the anti-conscription violence of 1916 that erupted when the Russian Empire began to draft Muslims for army service during World War I. In the months following the October 1917 Revolution the Bolsheviks seized power in many parts of the Russian Empire and the Russian Civil War began. Turkestani Muslim political movements attempted to form an autonomous government in the city of Kokand, in the Ferghana Valley. The Bolsheviks launched an assault on Kokand in February 1918 and carried out a general massacre of up to 25,000 people. The massacre rallied support to the Basmachi movements who waged  a guerrilla war and a conventional war that seized control of large parts of the Ferghana Valley and much of Turkestan.

The fortunes of the decentralized movement fluctuated throughout the early 1920s but by 1923 the Red Army's extensive campaigns dealt the Basmachis many defeats. After major Red Army campaigns and concessions regarding economic and Islamic practices in the mid-1920s, the military fortunes and popular support of the Basmachi declined. Resistance to Soviet/Russian rule did flare up again to a lesser extent in response to collectivization campaigns in the pre-WWII Era.

Soviet Rule (1920–1991)

In 1924, the Tajik Autonomous Soviet Socialist Republic was created as a part of Uzbekistan, but when national borders were drawn in 1928 (during the administrative delimitation) the ancient Tajik cities of Bukhara and Samarkand were placed outside the Tajikistan SSR. As citizens of the newly established Uzbek SSR, many Tajiks came under pressure to conform to their newly ascribed "Uzbek" identity, and under threat of exile, many were forced to change their identity and sign in passports as "Uzbeks".  Tajik schools were closed and Tajiks were not appointed to leadership positions simply because of their ethnicity.

Between 1927 and 1934 collectivization of agriculture and a rapid expansion of cotton production took place, especially in the southern region. Soviet collectivization policy brought violence against peasants and forced resettlement occurred throughout Tajikistan. Consequently, some peasants fought collectivization and revived the Basmachi movement. Some small scale industrial development also occurred during this time along with the expansion of irrigation infrastructure.

Two rounds of Soviet purges directed by Moscow (1927–1934 and 1937–1938) resulted in the expulsion of nearly 10,000 people, from all levels of the Communist Party of Tajikistan. Ethnic Russians were sent in to replace those expelled and subsequently Russians dominated party positions at all levels, including the top position of first secretary. Between 1926 and 1959 the proportion of Russians among Tajikistan's population grew from less than 1% to 13%. Bobojon Ghafurov, Tajikistan's First Secretary of the Communist Party of Tajikistan from 1946–1956 was the only Tajikistani politician of significance outside the country during the Soviet Era. He was followed in office by Tursun Uljabayev (1956–61), Jabbor Rasulov (1961–1982), and Rahmon Nabiyev (1982–1985, 1991–1992).

Tajiks began to be conscripted into the Soviet Army in 1939 and during World War II around 260,000 Tajik citizens fought against Germany, Finland and Japan. Between 60,000(4%) and 120,000(8%) of Tajikistan's 1,530,000 citizens were killed during World War II. Following the war and Stalin's reign attempts were made to further expand the agriculture and industry of Tajikistan. During 1957–58 Nikita Khrushchev's Virgin Lands Campaign focused attention on Tajikistan, where living conditions, education and industry lagged behind the other Soviet Republics.

In the 1980s, Tajikistan had the lowest household saving rate in the USSR, the lowest percentage of households in the two top per capita income groups, and the lowest rate of university graduates per 1000 people.

Living standards were undermined during the tenure of Kahar Mahkamov as first secretary of the Communist Party of Tajikistan from 1985. Mahkamov's attempted marketisation of the Tajik economy aggravated the poor living conditions and unemployment. On the eve of the Soviet collapse Tajikistan was suffering from a declining economy and dim prospects for recovery. The glasnost policy of openness initiated by Mikhail Gorbachev offered disgruntled Tajiks a chance to voice their grievances. In 1991, the Soviet Union collapsed, and Tajikistan declared its independence.

Republic of Tajikistan (1991 to present)

The Tajikistan Soviet Socialist Republic (SSR) was among the last republics of the Soviet Union to declare its independence. On September 9 (1991), following the collapse of the Union of Soviet Socialist Republics (USSR), Tajikistan declared its independence. During this time, use of the Tajik language, an official language of the Tajikistan SSR next to Russian, was increasingly promoted. Ethnic Russians, who had held many governing posts, lost much of their influence and more Tajiks became politically active.

The nation almost immediately fell into a civil war that involved various factions fighting one another; these factions were often distinguished by clan loyalties.  The non-Muslim population, particularly Russians and Jews, fled the country during this time because of persecution, increased poverty and better economic opportunities in the West or in other former Soviet republics.

Emomali Rahmon came to power in 1994, and continues to rule to this day. Ethnic cleansing was controversial during the civil war in Tajikistan. By the end of the war Tajikistan was in a state of complete devastation. The estimated dead numbered over 100,000. Around 1.2 million people were refugees inside and outside the country. In 1997, a ceasefire was reached between Rahmon and opposition parties (United Tajik Opposition).

Peaceful elections were held in 1999, but they were reported by the opposition as unfair, and Rahmon was re-elected by almost unanimous vote. Russian troops were stationed in southern Tajikistan, in order to guard the border with Afghanistan, until summer 2005. Since the September 11, 2001 attacks, American, Indian and French troops have also been stationed in the country.

In October 2020, President Emomali Rahmon was re-elected for next seven-year period with 90 per cent of the votes, following a tightly controlled and largely ceremonial election.

See also
 Guzel Maitdinova
 Dissolution of the Soviet Union
 History of Central Asia
 Politics of Tajikistan
 Soviet Central Asia

References

Footnotes

Sources and further reading

Asimov, M.S. Tadzhikskaya Sovetskaya Sotsialisticheskaya Respublika(The Tajik Soviet Socialist Republic). (Dushanbe: Akademiya Nauk Tadzhikskoy SSR) 1974.
Barthold, V.V. Работы по Исторической Географии (Moscow) 2002.
Barthold, V.V.  Turkestan Down to the Mongol Invasion (London: Luzacs & Co) 1968.
Becker, Seymour. Russia’s Protectorates in Central Asia: Bukhara and Khiva, 1865-1924  (Cambridge, Mass.: Harvard University Press) 1968.
Burton, Audrey. The Bukharans: A Dynastic, Diplomatic and Commercial History, 1550-1702 (London: Curzon Press) 1997.
Carrère D’Encausse, Hélène. Islam and the Russian Empire: Reform and Revolution in Central Asia (London: I.B. Tauris) 1988.
Christian, David.  A History of Russia, Central Asia and Mongolia (Oxford: Blackwell) 1998.
Hiro, Dilip. Between Marx and Muhammad (London:HarperCollins) 1995.
Kapur, Harish.  Soviet Russia and Asia, 1917–1927, a study of Soviet policy towards Turkey, Iran and Afghanistan (London: Joseph for the Geneva Graduate Institute of International Studies) 1966.
Luknitsky, Pavel. Soviet Tajikistan (Moscow: Foreign Languages Publishing House) 1954.
Masov, Rahim. The History of a National Catastrophe (Minneapolis) 1996. Available on-line here
Pipes, Richard. The Formation of the Soviet Union, Communism and Nationalism 1917-1923 (Cambridge, Mass.: Harvard University Press) 1964.
Rashid, Ahmed. Jihad: The Rise of Militant Islam in Central Asia (Hyderabad: Orient Longman) 2002.
Rawlinson, H.G.  Bactria : The History of a Forgotten Empire (New Delhi: Asian Educational Services) 2002.
Wheeler, Geoffrey. The Modern History of Soviet Central Asia (London: Weidenfeld and Nicolson) 1964.
Soucek, Svat.  A History of Inner Asia (Cambridge University Press) 2000.
Zenkovsky, Serge A. Pan-Turkism & Islam in Russia (Harvard University Press) 1960.

Further reading 

 Poopak NikTalab. Sarve Samarghand (Cedar of Samarkand), continuous interpretation of Rudaki's poems, Tehran 2020, Faradid Publications {Introduction

History of Tajikistan
History of Central Asia